Acanthaspis concinnula is a species of assassin bug that has been reported as a specialist predator of the fire ant Solenopsis geminata.

References

Insects of Central America
Reduviidae
Insects described in 1863